Bernhard Rohloff is the founder of Rohloff AG and the inventor of several innovative products, amongst other the 14 speed Rohloff Speedhub 500/14 planetary gear hub.

Rohloff studied machine-engineering at Olympia while working part-time at Henschel und Thyssen, a German locomotive manufacturer. After graduation, he worked at Mercedes-Benz with development of automobile driveshafts.

Rohloff AG
Later he struck out on his own and founded Rohloff AG, where he first invented an advanced narrow chain that soon became the industry standard for road-bikes and was used by several Tour de France winners, and the manufacturing methods therefore. He personally designed "the green beast", a proprietary machine for manufacturing SLT-99 chains. Rohloff AG became an OEM chain manufacturer for Campagnolo.

Rohloff Speedhub 500/14
In the early 90s Rohloff began development of the Rohloff Speedhub 500/14, which was subsequently patented and released into the marked in 1998. It is the only gearhub (with the new Kindernay XIV) on the market with more than 11 speeds. The gearhub is manufactured and assembled by hand in the company's premises in Hessen, Germany.

References

Mountain bike innovators
Living people
Engineers from Hesse
20th-century German inventors
Businesspeople from Hesse
Year of birth missing (living people)